Formula Vee (Formula Fau Vee in Brazil and Germany) or Formula Volkswagen is a popular open wheel, single-seater junior motor racing formula, with relatively low costs in comparison to Formula Ford.

On the international stage, Niki Lauda, Emerson Fittipaldi, Nelson Piquet and Keke Rosberg, all Formula 1 champions, and Scott Dixon a six time IndyCar champion raced Formula Vees in Europe, New Zealand, or America at the beginning of their careers.  In Australia, V8 Supercar drivers Larry Perkins, Colin Bond, John Blanchard, John Bowe, Jason Bargwanna and Paul Stokell were also racers in Formula Vee.

Formula First, raced in the US and New Zealand, employs the same chassis, but with upgraded motor, brakes and steering. Australia’s modern Formula Vee car rules are the definition for formula first in these countries

Description
The class is based on a pre-1963 Volkswagen Beetle, utilizing a collection of the stock parts to form a competitive race car around a purpose-built tube frame and racing tires. The VW engine, transmission, front suspension, brakes and wheels are stock or modified stock parts.  The chassis is a tube frame design and the body is fiberglass or carbon fiber.  The intention of this class is for the average person to build and maintain the car.

Over the years, the rules have evolved to improve performance, lower cost, or to allow replacement of discontinued parts. In 2003, Grassroots Motorsports presented Formula Vee with the Editors' Choice Award.

A top-running Formula Vee will go  and corner at about 1.6 g.

Purchasing and running a Formula Vee car is relatively affordable compared to most motorsport categories.  In 2022, a brand-new race car for the Australian Formula Vee series was estimated to cost approximately "50-55,000 Australian dollars" (approximately $US 37,000), with competitive second-hand cars costing much less.  Renting a car for a race meeting was estimated at $A1000 (approximately $US700). 

Each year, Formula Vee is one of the classes at the SCCA Runoffs, which awards a national championship. While it is primarily a class in the Sports Car Club of America, many other organizations have adopted the Formula Vee as a class.

Variants
Variants of the Formula Vee rules exist in the Canada, UK, Ireland, Australia, South Africa, Germany and New Zealand.

Particularly notable is Formula First, raced in the US and New Zealand, which employs the same chassis, but with later model Beetle parts, a larger  motor (New Zealand uses the  variant) and other upgraded components such as disc brakes rack and pinion steering.

(Formula Super Vee, although initially similar, soon moved to water-cooled  VW four-cylinder engines for higher-tech and faster cars).

SCCA Runoffs Winners

Michael Varacins has the most titles with seven.

† Denotes President's Cup Winner

List of Formula Vee championships and Events

See also
Formula Vee at the SCCA National Championship Runoffs
 Super Vee

External links

http://www.nefv.org/ Northeast Formula Vee USA https://www.facebook.com/groups/nefv.org
Challenge Cup Series (US, South Africa & Brazil collaboration)
Formula First USA
formulaveeracing.org (US)
formulavee.us (US)
ApexSpeed.com (US)
Formula Vee (Ireland)
Australian Formula Vee Website
Australian Formula Vee Specifications
New Zealand Formula First (née Formula Vee)
Formula Vee (UK)
750 Motor Club (UK organising club)
Formula 1200 – Canada

Formula Vee South Africa
Historic Formula Vee in Australia 
Historische Formel Vau Europa

References

Vee
Sports Car Club of America
Motorsport categories in Australia
Volkswagen Beetle modifications
Volkswagen in motorsport